DC Showcase: Catwoman, also titled as simply Catwoman, is a 2011 short animated superhero film, directed by Lauren Montgomery and written by Paul Dini. The film features Eliza Dushku as Catwoman / Selina Kyle in her first solo tale, as she attempts to bring both a Gotham City crime boss called Rough Cut and his smuggling ring to an end, stumbling upon a mysterious cargo shipment far worse than just smuggled diamonds. DC Showcase: Catwoman was released on October 18, 2011, as a bonus feature and continuation of the Catwoman story line on Batman: Year One Blu-ray and DVD. It is the fifth installment in the DC Showcase series.

Plot
The film starts with two men pursuing a grey cat in an attempt to shoot it dead. The cat supposedly jumps into the river and is presumed dead. As the two men leave in a limousine with a crime boss called Rough Cut, Catwoman is shown under the bridge with the grey cat, which has a yellow wristband around its neck, grabbing Catwoman's interest.

Later on, Rough Cut and his two cohorts go to a strip club. As a woman dances and strips, he gives her a small chunk of diamond. Catwoman enters the strip club and covers for the other stripper women, but this only proves to be a way for her to confront Rough Cut. As every single person has already fled the strip club, Catwoman and Rough Cut are left alone. After a short fight, he escapes before she can get him. Some while later, Catwoman attacks Rough Cut whilst he is driving a craned truck. Catwoman slips the crane hook under the truck and escapes before it crashes, the hook flying over and slicing a ship full of goods in half. The truck overturns and Rough Cut is killed.

When Catwoman goes to the ship, she finds a group of trafficked girls, which is revealed to be the mysterious cargo shipment. Catwoman notices Holly Robinson to be one of the girls. As the police arrive, Selina Kyle comforts Holly, giving her the yellow wristband that belonged to Holly before she was trafficked. Selina also gives Holly a handful of diamonds because she is in need. The film ends with Catwoman jumping from one building to another as Holly watches her disappear into the night.

Cast
 Eliza Dushku as Catwoman / Selina Kyle
 John DiMaggio as Rough Cut, Motorcycle Dude (uncredited)
 Liliana Mumy as Holly Robinson
 Kevin Michael Richardson as Moe
 Tara Strong as Buttermilk Skye
 Cree Summer as Lily

External links

References

2011 direct-to-video films
2011 films
2011 animated films
2011 short films
Catwoman in other media
C
2010s American animated films
2010s direct-to-video animated superhero films
Films directed by Lauren Montgomery
Films with screenplays by Paul Dini
Warner Bros. Animation animated short films
Warner Bros. direct-to-video animated films
Animated superhero films
Films based on works by Bill Finger
Films based on works by Bob Kane
2010s Warner Bros. animated short films
2010s English-language films

es:Batman: Año Uno
it:Batman: Year One (film)#DC Showcase: Catwoman